UFC 225: Whittaker vs. Romero 2 was a mixed martial arts event produced by the Ultimate Fighting Championship that was held on June 9, 2018, at the United Center in Chicago, Illinois.

Background
A UFC Middleweight Championship bout between current champion Robert Whittaker and former interim title challenger (as well as 2000 Olympic silver medalist and former world champion in freestyle wrestling) Yoel Romero served as the event headliner. The pairing previously met in July 2017 at UFC 213 with Whittaker winning the interim title via unanimous decision.

However at the weigh-ins, Romero initially weighed in at 186 pounds, 1 pound over the middleweight limit for a title fight. Romero was given additional time to make weight, but he weighed in at 185.2 pounds. The commission initially gave him an additional 2 hours, but after an hour Romero was made to stop cutting weight, and the bout proceeded as a non-title contest. He was fined 30 percent of his purse, which went to Whittaker.

An interim UFC Welterweight Championship bout between former UFC Lightweight Champion Rafael dos Anjos and Colby Covington (initially linked to UFC 224 a month earlier) served as the co-main event.

Rashad Coulter was scheduled to face Allen Crowder at the event. However, on May 12, it was announced that Chris de la Rocha has replaced Crowder for undisclosed reasons.

Bobby Green was scheduled to face Clay Guida at the event. However, on May 29, Green suffered an injury on his right knee and was replaced by Charles Oliveira.

Results

Bonus awards
The following fighters were awarded $50,000 bonuses:
Fight of the Night ($100,000): Robert Whittaker (Yoel Romero was unable to receive his share of the bonus money due to missing weight).
Performance of the Night: Curtis Blaydes and Charles Oliveira

Aftermath
On July 7, 2021, it was announced that the Illinois Department of Financial and Professional Regulation overturned Mike Jackson's unanimous decision win against CM Punk to a no contest due to a marijuana positive test on fight night. He was officially suspended for three months retroactive to the date of the fight. The decision wasn't reported publicly until July 2021.

See also
List of UFC events
List of current UFC fighters
2018 in UFC

References

Ultimate Fighting Championship events
Events in Chicago
2018 in mixed martial arts
March 2018 sports events in the United States
Mixed martial arts in Chicago
Sports competitions in Chicago
2018 in sports in Illinois